Connor Coles (born 7 September 1994) is a speedway rider from England.

Speedway career 
Coles began his speedway career riding for Rye House Raiders during the 2012 National League speedway season and then moved to Kent Kings for the 2013 National League speedway season. He then spent three seasons with the Mildenhall Fen Tigers, in which time he helped the team win the National Trophy. It was in 2017 that Coles moved up to the SGB Championship and rode for Newcastle Diamonds for the SGB Championship 2017 season. He also appeared for Eastbourne and the Isle of Wight in the third division. Following a season with Buxton he joined Edinburgh in the SGB Championship 2019 and Stoke in the NDL. In 2021, he rode for the Belle Vue Colts.

In 2022, he rode for the Scunthorpe Scorpions and Plymouth Gladiators in the SGB Championship 2022 and Leicester Lion Cubs during the 2022 National Development League speedway season. As part of the Leicester team he helped them dominate the season by winning the league and KO Cup double.

In 2023, he signed for Berwick Bandits for the SGB Premiership 2023.

Personal life
Coles is a third generation rider, with his father Michael Coles and grandfather Bob Coles both being former professional riders.

References 

Living people
1994 births
British speedway riders
Belle Vue Colts riders
Berwick Bandits riders
Buxton Hitmen riders
Eastbourne Eagles riders
Edinburgh Monarchs riders
Isle of Wight Islanders riders
Kent Kings riders
Mildenhall Fen Tigers riders
Newcastle Diamonds riders
Plymouth Gladiators speedway riders
Scunthorpe Scorpions riders
Stoke Potters riders
Sportspeople from Exeter